Piano Interpretations by Bud Powell  is a studio album by jazz pianist Bud Powell, released in 1956 by Norgran, featuring two sessions that Powell recorded at Fine Sound Studios in New York in April 1955.

The album was re-issued on LP by Verve (MGV 8167), and released as a CD replica by Verve (Japan) in 2006 (POCJ-2743). The sessions (with alternate takes) are also available on The Complete Bud Powell on Verve (1994) CD box set.

History
The album presents the April 25 master takes in full, apart from "Bean and the Boys" (the version here is from April 27). The April 27 session is split between this album and The Lonely One....

Track listing 12" LP (MGN 1077, MGV 8167)
"Conception" (George Shearing) – 3:36
"East of the Sun (and West of the Moon)" (Brooks Bowman) – 3:55
"Heart and Soul" (Hoagy Carmichael, Frank Loesser) – 3:18
"Willow Groove" (aka "Willow Grove") (Bud Powell) – 4:25
"Crazy Rhythm" (Joseph Meyer, Roger Wolfe Kahn, Irving Caesar) – 3:36

"Willow Weep for Me" (Ann Ronell) – 4:43
"Bean and the Boys" (Coleman Hawkins) (contrafact of "Lover Come Back to Me") – 5:14
"Lady Bird" (Tadd Dameron) – 4:44
"Stairway to the Stars" (Matty Malneck, Frank Signorelli, Mitchell Parish) – 4:55

Personnel

Performance
April 25, 1955, side A tracks 1, 3-5 and side B track 1. April 27, 1955, side A track 2 and side B tracks 2-4. Fine Sound Studios, New York.
Bud Powell – piano
George Duvivier – bass
Art Taylor – drums

Production
Norman Granz – producer
David Stone Martin – cover design

References

Bud Powell albums
1956 albums
Albums produced by Norman Granz
Norgran Records albums
Albums with cover art by David Stone Martin